

Ernst Schirlitz (7 September 1893 – 27 November 1978) was a German vice admiral in the navy (Kriegsmarine) of Nazi Germany. He served during World War II and was a recipient of the  Knight's Cross of the Iron Cross. He surrendered at the end of World War II after the Allied siege of La Rochelle.

Schirlitz served as a watch officer on Luftschiff "L 33" which crashed in Little Wigborough, Essex on 24 September 1916. Schirlitz was taken prisoner of war by the British and was released in November 1919.

Awards
 Iron Cross (1914) 2nd and 1st Class
 German Cross in Gold on 1 December 1944 as Vizeadmiral in fortress La Rochelle
 Knight's Cross of the Iron Cross on 11 March 1945 as Vizeadmiral and as commander Atlantic coast and of fortress La Rochelle.

References

Citations

Bibliography

 
 
 

1893 births
1978 deaths
People from Sztum County
World War I prisoners of war held by the United Kingdom
Imperial German Navy personnel of World War I
Reichsmarine personnel
Vice admirals of the Kriegsmarine
Recipients of the Gold German Cross
Recipients of the Knight's Cross of the Iron Cross
People from West Prussia